"No More Blue Horizons (Fool, Fool, Fool)" is a song by China Crisis, released as their third single in 1982. It is included on the band's debut album Difficult Shapes & Passive Rhythms, Some People Think It's Fun to Entertain and on the compilation album Collection: The Very Best of China Crisis.

Track listing
UK 7" single
"No More Blue Horizons (Fool, Fool, Fool)" – 3.45
"No Ordinary Lover" – 3.03

UK 12" single
"No More Blue Horizons (Fool, Fool, Fool)" – 5.02
"No Ordinary Lover" – 3.03
"Watching Over Burning Fields" – 6.22

References

1982 singles
1982 songs
China Crisis songs
Virgin Records singles